Aretes or Aretas was a Macedonian general. At the Battle of Gaugamela, he commanded the sarissophoroi (also known as prodromoi), a unit of versatile cavalry, adept at scouting, but with an ability for close-combat in battle. He replaced Protomachus as the commander of this unit. At Gaugamela the sarissophoroi were responsible for finally routing the Persian left wing cavalry, winning the battle in this sector. In their final charge the sarissophoroi broke the Massagetae heavy cavalry, Aretes personally killing their leader.

References

Bibliography
Ashley, J.R. (2004) The Macedonian Empire: The Era of Warfare Under Philip II and Alexander the Great, 359-323 B.C. McFarland.

Who's who in the age of Alexander the Great: prosopography of Alexander's empire, 

Generals of Alexander the Great
4th-century BC Macedonians